Sartidia is a genus of Southern African and Madagascan plants in the grass family. It was split from Aristida in 1963 by South African botanist Bernard de Winter and contains six known species, of which Sartidia perrieri is considered extinct. Their natural habitats are warm, semi-arid savanna and dry forest at altitudes of  where rainfall ranges from 250 to 1,500 mm per year. They are perennial grasses with inflorescence in a panicle.

Other than most species in subfamily Aristidoideae, Sartidia species use the ancestral C photosynthetic pathway. Phylogenetic analyses suggest that Sartidia is the sister genus of Stipagrostis, an important C genus from Africa and Southwest Asia.

 Species
 Sartidia angolensis (C.E.Hubb.) De Winter – Angola, Zambia, Zimbabwe, Namibia
 Sartidia dewinteri Munday & Fish – Mpumalanga (South Africa), Eswatini
 Sartidia isaloensis Voronts., Razanatsoa & Besnard – Madagascar
 Sartidia jucunda (Schweick.) De Winter – Limpopo (South Africa)
 Sartidia perrieri (A.Camus) Bourreil – Madagascar (extinct)
 Sartidia vanderystii (De Wild.) De Winter – Democratic Republic of the Congo

References

External links

Flora of Africa
Poaceae genera
Aristidoideae